List of events in the year 2015 in Honduras.

Incumbents 
 President – Juan Orlando Hernández
 National congress president – Mauricio Oliva
 Supreme Court president – Jorge Alberto Rivera Avilés

Events

Arts and Culture

March
3 March - An archaeological expedition finds the legendary White City in northeastern Honduras, with artifacts that date to A.D. 1000 to 1400.

References 

 
Years of the 21st century in Honduras
Honduras
Honduras
2010s in Honduras